The canton of Denain is an administrative division of the Nord department, northern France. Its borders were modified at the French canton reorganisation which came into effect in March 2015. Its seat is in Denain.

It consists of the following communes:

Abscon
Avesnes-le-Sec
Bouchain
Denain
Douchy-les-Mines
Émerchicourt
Escaudain
Hordain
Lieu-Saint-Amand
Lourches
Marquette-en-Ostrevant
Mastaing
Neuville-sur-Escaut
Noyelles-sur-Selle
Rœulx
Wasnes-au-Bac
Wavrechain-sous-Denain
Wavrechain-sous-Faulx

References

Cantons of Nord (French department)